DYAP is a callsign for:
 Mom's Radio Cebu of the Southern Broadcasting Network, or
 DYAP Radyo Patrol 765 of the Palawan Broadcasting Corporation and ABS-CBN Corporation.